Bieber (formerly Chalk Ford) is a census-designated place (CDP) in Lassen County, California. The ZIP Code is 96009. The community is inside area code 530.

History
The settlement sprang up at the Pit River ford in 1877. The first post office at Bieber opened in 1877.
It was named for Nathan Bieber, a local shopkeeper. It was a major junction between the Great Northern and Western Pacific railroads for north–south traffic, now owned by BNSF Railway.

Demographics

At the 2010 census, Bieber had a population of 312. The racial makeup of Bieber was 264 (84.6%) White, 0 (0.0%) African American, 15 (4.8%) Native American, 1 (0.3%) Asian, 0 (0.0%) Pacific Islander, 24 (7.7%) from other races, and 8 (2.6%) from two or more races. Hispanic or Latino of any race were 72 people (23.1%).

The whole population lived in households; no one lived in non-institutionalized group quarters and no one was institutionalized.

There were 123 households, 41 (33.3%) had children under the age of 18 living in them, 67 (54.5%) were opposite-sex married couples living together, 7 (5.7%) had a female householder with no husband present, 10 (8.1%) had a male householder with no wife present.  There were 6 (4.9%) unmarried opposite-sex partnerships, and 1 (0.8%) same-sex married couples or partnerships. 34 households (27.6%) were one person and 12 (9.8%) had someone living alone who was 65 or older. The average household size was 2.54.  There were 84 families (68.3% of households); the average family size was 3.05.

The age distribution was 78 people (25.0%) under the age of 18, 27 people (8.7%) aged 18 to 24, 77 people (24.7%) aged 25 to 44, 88 people (28.2%) aged 45 to 64, and 42 people (13.5%) who were 65 or older.  The median age was 38.4 years. For every 100 females, there were 93.8 males.  For every 100 females age 18 and over, there were 105.3 males.

There were 148 housing units, at an average density of 87.4 per square mile; of the occupied units, 90 (73.2%) were owner-occupied and 33 (26.8%) were rented. The homeowner vacancy rate was 4.2%; the rental vacancy rate was 10.8%.  237 people (76.0% of the population) lived in owner-occupied housing units and 75 people (24.0%) lived in rental housing units.

Politics

References

Census-designated places in Lassen County, California
Populated places established in 1877
Census-designated places in California
1877 establishments in California